Reinildo Isnard Mandava (born 21 January 1994) is a Mozambican professional footballer who plays as a left back for La Liga club Atlético Madrid and the Mozambique national team.

Club career
Born in Beira, Mandava began his football career with Ferroviário da Beira and GD Maputo. In December 2015, he signed for Portuguese club Benfica and was assigned to their reserve team. In June 2017, he was loaned out to Sporting da Covilhã in LigaPro for one season.

In 2018 he moved to Belenenses SAD, and in January 2019 he moved to French club Lille on loan with a €3 million option to purchase the player at the end of the season. On 31 May 2019, it was confirmed that Lille had completed the permanent purchase of Mandava.

On 31 January 2022, Spanish club Atlético Madrid announced the transfer of Mandava on a three-and-a-half-year contract.

International career
Mandava made his international debut for Mozambique in 2014.

Career statistics

Club

International goals
Scores and results list Mozambique's goal tally first, score column indicates score after each Mandava goal.

Honours
Lille
Ligue 1: 2020–21
Trophée des Champions: 2021

Mozambique
COSAFA Cup runner-up: 2015

Individual
UNFP Ligue 1 Team of the Year: 2020–21

References

External links

Profile at the Atlético Madrid website

1994 births
Living people
People from Beira, Mozambique
Mozambican footballers
Association football fullbacks
Mozambique international footballers
Clube Ferroviário da Beira players
S.L. Benfica B players
AD Fafe players
S.C. Covilhã players
Belenenses SAD players
Lille OSC players
Atlético Madrid footballers
Liga Portugal 2 players
Primeira Liga players
Ligue 1 players
Mozambican expatriate footballers
Expatriate footballers in Portugal
Expatriate footballers in France
Expatriate footballers in Spain
Mozambican expatriate sportspeople in Portugal
Mozambican expatriate sportspeople in France
Mozambican expatriate sportspeople in Spain
La Liga players
GD Maputo players